= Molwad =

- Village
- Country: India
- State: Karnataka
- District: Belagavi
- Talukas: Kagawad

Languages
  - Official: Kannada
- Time zone: UTC+5:30 (IST)
- ISO 3166 code: IN-KA
- Vehicle registration: KA23

Molwad is a village in Belagavi district of Karnataka, India.
